Ezekiel 14 is the fourteenth chapter of the Book of Ezekiel in the Hebrew Bible or the Old Testament of the Christian Bible. This book contains the prophecies attributed to the prophet/priest Ezekiel, and is one of the Books of the Prophets. This chapter records a visit of some of the elders of Israel to Ezekiel, and God's response through the prophet dealing with the sins of idolatry.

Text
The original text was written in the Hebrew language. This chapter is divided into 23 verses.

Textual witnesses
Some early manuscripts containing the text of this chapter in Hebrew are of the Masoretic Text tradition, which includes the Codex Cairensis (895), the Petersburg Codex of the Prophets (916), Aleppo Codex (10th century), Codex Leningradensis (1008).

There is also a translation into Koine Greek known as the Septuagint, made in the last few centuries BC. Extant ancient manuscripts of the Septuagint version include Codex Vaticanus (B; B; 4th century), Codex Alexandrinus (A; A; 5th century) and Codex Marchalianus (Q; Q; 6th century).

The idolatrous elders (14:1–11)
A group of elders approached Ezekiel (cf. Ezekiel 8:1 and 20:1) to 'enquire' of YHWH, which is a traditional practice of using the prophet as mediator to convey specific questions to YHWH (cf. ). YHWH told Ezekiel that he refuses to hear in the enquiry 'because of the seriousness of the elders' idolatry' (cf. 20:3–4) and 'the elders are not condemned simply for idolatry, but for 'lifting up' their idols 'into their hearts' (cf. the Jerusalem elders in 8:9–12, who maintained secret 'picture rooms' inside the temple itself). YHWH only responded by warning the elders 'to turn back from idolatry or suffer death at his hands' (verses 6–8), and if a prophet should deliver a response to the idolater's enquiry, YHWH would then destroy the prophet as well as the enquirer.

Verse 3
 Son of man, these men have set up their idols in their heart,
 and put the stumblingblock of their iniquity before their face:
 should I be enquired of at all by them?
 "Son of man" (Hebrew: בן־אדם -): this phrase is used 93 times to address Ezekiel.
Originally means "trunks, logs, blocks," that can be "rolled", it could denote "the primitive stone menhir or construct.
 "Set up their idols in their heart": Rashi interprets this as "Their heart is toward their idols to worship [them]."

Noah, Dan'el, and Job (14:12–23)
In this section YHWH addresses the question of individual responsibility for sin, which was mentioned in chapter 9 when the righteous people in Jerusalem were 'marked so as to escape the city's destruction' (Ezekiel 9:4; cf. ), and whether a few righteous individuals might suffice to save an entire city (cf. Abraham in ) or at least members of their own family (cf. Abraham for Lot in Genesis 19:29). The number of citizens to be spared was apparently quite small, as Ezekiel protests that YHWH is destroying the last remnant of Israel. YHWH posits that should the three 'legendary paragons of virtue': Noah, Dan'el, and Job, inhabit this land, even 'they would be helpless to save their own children from YHWH's punishment of famine, wild beasts, sword, and plague', which recalls the scenario in chapter 5 and 7 that YHWH is about to bring 'four levitically prescribed punishments against Jerusalem and Israel'. The conclusion of this chapter is clear: Jerusalem ('which is patently not inhabited by Noah, Dan'el, or Job') will not be spared, even 'for the sake of some few righteous citizens, or by the righteousness of those exiles whose children will now share in the city's doom'. YHWH adds an ironic note that there will be survivors of the city's destruction who will be brought into exile to show the exiles of 'their obvious wickedness', so people will know that 'YHWH did not destroy the city without reason'.

Verse 14
 Though these three men, Noah, Daniel, and Job, were in it,
 they should deliver but their own souls by their righteousness,
 saith the Lord God.
 "Three men": These three men are selected as they had pled in different "worlds", according to Rashi, that is Noah witnesses the world destroyed and rebuilt, Daniel the temple destroyed and rebuilt, Job the prosperity/"greatness" destroyed and rebuilt. These three Israel's righteous spiritual heroes "could not have prevailed with God in prayer to save the people" from the coming disasters.

Verse 20
 Though Noah, Daniel, and Job were in it, as I live, saith the Lord God,
 they shall deliver neither son nor daughter;
 they shall but deliver their own souls by their righteousness.
 "They shall but deliver their own souls by their righteousness": The city of Sodom could be saved with a minimum number of righteous people, but the righteous people can only save one's own soul in the case of determined judgment on Jerusalem.

See also
Daniel
Daniel in rabbinic literature
Job
Noah
Related Bible parts: Genesis 6, Job 1, Jeremiah 15, Daniel 6, Hebrews 11

Notes

References

Sources

External links

Jewish
Ezekiel 14 Hebrew with Parallel English
Ezekiel 14 Hebrew with Rashi's Commentary

Christian
Ezekiel 14 English Translation with Parallel Latin Vulgate

14